Grochów is a suburb of Warsaw.

Grochów may also refer to:
Grochów, Łódź Voivodeship (central Poland)
Grochów, Sokołów County in Masovian Voivodeship (east-central Poland)
Grochów, Lubusz Voivodeship (west Poland)
Grochów, West Pomeranian Voivodeship (north-west Poland)